Down the Rabbit Hole: Curious Adventures and Cautionary Tales of a Former Playboy Bunny is a New York Times bestselling memoir by ex-Playboy Bunny Holly Madison. Madison's debut tell-all features her early life and her infamous adventures as the former main girlfriend of Hugh Hefner and star of the television show The Girls Next Door.

Published on June 23, 2015, by Dey Street Books, this 352-page book was featured in many online and print news sources like TMZ, People magazine, Us Weekly, and Huffington Post, explained Madison's perspective of life at the Playboy Mansion. 

In her memoir, Madison revealed that she hadn't planned on penning the tell-all until she realized young fans had a wrong idea about life within the mansion. The book not only caused tension between Madison and ex-boyfriend Hugh Hefner but former girlfriend Kendra Wilkinson as well. Wilkinson was so bothered by the memoir that it became spurred into an ongoing feud between herself and Madison. 

In 2015 Madison told E! Online the possibility of a TV movie in the future. 

Madison's follow-up to Down the Rabbit Hole, titled The Vegas Diaries: Romance, Rolling the Dice, and the Road to Reinvention, was published on May 17, 2016, by Dey Street Books.

References

External links 
 Down the Rabbit Hole on HarperCollin's website
 Holly Madison's website

American memoirs
2015 non-fiction books
Playboy
Dey Street books